François Lacombe (born February 2, 1948) is a Canadian former professional ice hockey defenceman, who played in the National Hockey League (NHL) and World Hockey Association (WHA) between 1968 and 1980. He spent parts of three seasons in the NHL with the Oakland Seals and Buffalo Sabres before moving to the WHA and playing for the Quebec Nordiques and Calgary Cowboys, playing briefly for the Nordiques again when they joined the NHL.

Professional hockey career
After short stints in the NHL with the Oakland Seals and Buffalo Sabres, Lacombe spent the majority of his career, in the WHA, with the Quebec Nordiques, plus a single season with the Calgary Cowboys. He played 3 games for Quebec in the NHL following the NHL–WHA merger.

Lacombe played a total of 78 regular-season NHL games, scoring two goals and adding 17 assists. He also appeared in 3 playoff games with Oakland in the 1969 Stanley Cup Playoffs, tallying one assist. Meanwhile, Lacombe played in 440 WHA games, scoring 38 goals and adding 139 assists.  He appeared in 54 Avco Cup playoff games in the WHA, scoring five goals and tallying ten assists.

In 1970 Lacombe was traded to the Montreal Canadiens along with California's first draft pick in 1971 (the Canadiens chose Guy Lafleur) for Ernie Hicke and Montreal's first round pick. The trade is considered one of the worst of all time.

Minor hockey
Lacombe is now coaching in Châteauguay with the Châteauguay Midget AAA Patriotes. 
He was arrested on March 12, 2008, after allegedly throwing a garbage can at a player on an opposing team sparking a bench clearing brawl.  The charges were later dropped.

Career statistics

Regular season and playoffs

References

External links

1948 births
Living people
Buffalo Sabres players
Calgary Cowboys players
Canadian ice hockey defencemen
Cincinnati Swords players
Fort Worth Wings players
French Quebecers
Ice hockey people from Montreal
Laval Titan coaches
Maine Nordiques players
Montreal Junior Canadiens players
National Hockey League broadcasters
Oakland Seals players
People from Lachine, Quebec
Providence Reds players
Quebec Nordiques (WHA) players
Quebec Nordiques announcers
Quebec Nordiques players
Syracuse Firebirds players
Canadian ice hockey coaches